This article includes the world record progression for the 4×50 metres freestyle relay and it shows the chronological history of world record times in that competitive short course swimming event.  The 4×50 metres freestyle relay is a relay event in which each of four swimmers on a team swims a 50-metre freestyle leg in sequence.  The world records are recognized by and maintained by FINA ("Fédération Internationale de Natation"), the international competitive swimming and aquatics federation that overseas the sport in international competition.

World records in swimming were first recognized by FINA in 1908.  The long course (50-metre pool) world records are historically older than the short course (25-metre pool) records.  FINA amended its regulations governing the recognition of world records in 1956; specifically, FINA mandated that only record times that were contested in 50-metre (or 55-yard) pools were eligible for recognition after that time.  The short-course world records have been separately recognized since 1991. On 25 July 2013 FINA Technical Swimming Congress voted to allow world records in the long course mixed 400 free relay and mixed 400 medley relay, as well as in six events in short course meters: the mixed 200 medley and 200 free relays, as well as the men's and women's 200 free relays and the men's and women's 200 medley relays. In October 2013 FINA decided to establish "standards" before something can be recognized as the first world record in these events. But later, on 13 March 2014, FINA officially ratified the eight world records set by Indiana University swimmers at the IU Relay Rally held on 26 September 2013 in Bloomington.

Men

Women

Mixed

All-time top 10 by country

Men
Correct as of December 2022

Women
Correct as of December 2022

Mixed
Correct as of December 2022

All-time top 25

Men
Correct as of December 2022

Women
Correct as of December 2022

Mixed
Correct as of December 2022

References

Freestyle relay 4×50 metres